Doriano Romboni (8 December 1968 in Lerici, Italy – 30 November 2013 in Latina, Italy) was an Italian Grand Prix motorcycle road racer.

Career 
Romboni raced in 125cc and 250cc World Championship races on Hondas. In 1996 he rode for the Aprilia factory in the 500cc class aboard a bike with a V-twin, 250cc engine that had been enlarged to 380cc. Aprilia tried to take advantage of the bike's lightweight and agility against their more powerful competition. Romboni managed to finish in 10th place in the 1997 season before Aprilia withdrew the project. He raced for the MuZ team in one race in the 1998 season.

In 1999 he switched to the Superbike World Championship on a private Ducati. He was a frontrunner in the early races. At Monza he briefly ran third behind Carl Fogarty and Troy Corser before he collided with Aaron Slight and hurt his leg. He briefly returned to the series in 2000 then again in 2004.

Death 
On 30 November 2013, Romboni died in a crash during the second edition of the Sic Supermoto Day, a race in honor of the memory of fellow Italian Marco Simoncelli, who also died in a crash in 2011.

Career statistics

Grand Prix motorcycle racing

Races by year
(key) (Races in bold indicate pole position) (Races in italics indicate fastest lap)

Superbike World Championship

Races by year
(key) (Races in bold indicate pole position) (Races in italics indicate fastest lap)

References 

1968 births
2013 deaths
Sportspeople from the Province of La Spezia
Italian motorcycle racers
Superbike World Championship riders
125cc World Championship riders
250cc World Championship riders
500cc World Championship riders
Motorcycle racers who died while racing
Sport deaths in Italy